SS Thorpehall was a small freighter built before the First World War. Completed in 1910, she was intended for the West African trade. During the Spanish Civil War of 1936–1939, the ship was sunk by Nationalist bombers in May 1938.

Description 
She had a vertical triple-expansion steam engine driving a single screw propeller. The engine was rated at a total of 173 nominal horsepower and produced .

Construction and career 
Thorpehall was laid down as yard number 259 by the Sunderland Shipbuilding Co. at its shipyard in Sunderland for the Watson Steamship Co. as Oakmere. Named after the village of Oakmere in Cheshire, the ship was launched on 8 June 1910 and completed on 13 July. She was sold to the Lever Brothers on 19 April 1916 and transferred to the company's subsidiary Bromport Steamship Co. on 9 May 1917. Oakmere was sold to MacAndrews and Co. on 25 September 1923 and renamed Bazan on 13 October. She was sold to the Westcliffe Shipping Co. on 26 October and renamed Thorpehall three days later.

References

Bibliography

Ships built on the River Wear
Steamships of the United Kingdom
Maritime incidents in 1938
World War I merchant ships of the United Kingdom
1910 ships
Ships of the Bromport Steamship Company